Martin Bodo Plenio (born 20 May 1968) is a German physicist, Alexander von Humboldt Professor, and Director of the Institute for Theoretical Physics at Ulm University.

He is notable for his work on entanglement theory, quantum technology and quantum biology.

Education 

He obtained his Diploma 1992 and Doctorate 1994 in physics from the University of Göttingen.

Career 

In 1995 – 1997, he was a Feodor Lynen Fellow at Imperial College London in the group of Prof. Sir. Peter Knight FRS. He was Lecturer (1998–2001), Senior Lecturer (2001–2003) and Full Professor (2003–2009) at Imperial College London. In 2009 he was awarded an Alexander von Humboldt Professorship of the Alexander von Humboldt Foundation and moved to Ulm University where he is Director of the Institute of Theoretical Physics and leads the Controlled Quantum Dynamics group. He held a part-time position at Imperial College London. He was awarded successive European Research Council Synergy in 2012 and in 2019. In 2016 he co-founded NVision Imaging Technologies a technology company in the quantum technologies domain.

In 2014 he was awarded €27Million for a research building to establish the Center for Quantum Biosciences of which he is the founding director

External links 
 Faculty profile

References 

1968 births
Living people
People from Ulm
21st-century German physicists
Quantum physicists